FK Partizan Momišići (Montenegrin Cyrillic: ФК Партизан Момишићи) is a Montenegrin football club based in Momišići, a suburb of Podgorica.

Football clubs in Montenegro
Football clubs in Podgorica